Sellam may refer to:

 Aïda Sellam, a Tunisian javelin thrower
 Ouled Sellam, a council "Commune" situated in northeastern Algeria